Alfonso Yáñez (born 20 March 1970 in Peru) is a Peruvian retired footballer.

Career

Yáñez started his career with Club Universitario de Deportes. In 1996, he signed for Al-Ittihad Club.

References

Peruvian footballers
Living people
1970 births
Association football midfielders
Peru international footballers
People from Callao
Querétaro F.C. footballers
Club Universitario de Deportes footballers
Club Alianza Lima footballers
Deportivo Saprissa players
Juan Aurich footballers
SV Dakota players
Ittihad FC players